Vaudreuil was a federal electoral district in the province of Quebec, Canada, represented in the  House of Commons of Canada from 1867 to 1914, and from 1968 to 1997.

History
It was originally created by the British North America Act, 1867, and existed until 1914, when it was merged into Vaudreuil—Soulanges riding.

Vaudreuil riding was recreated in 1966, and existed until 1997, when it was renamed "Vaudreuil—Soulanges". (See Vaudreuil—Soulanges.)

Members of Parliament

This riding elected the following Members of Parliament:

Geography
It initially consisted of Isle Perrot, the Seigniories of Vaudreuil and Rigaud, and the first, second, third and fourth ranges of the Township of Newton and augmentation adjacent.

When it was re-created in 1966, it was defined to consist of:
 that part of the City of Pierrefonds situated southwest of the Town of Roxboro;
 the Towns of Baie-D'Urfé, Beaconsfield, Dorion, Île-Cadieux, Île-Perrot, Kirkland, Pincourt, Pointe-du-Moulin, Rigaud, Sainte-Anne-de-Bellevue, Sainte-Geneviève and Vaudreuil;
 the Counties of Soulanges and Vaudreuil;
 the village municipality of Senneville;
 the parish municipality of Saint-Raphaël-de-l'Île-Bizard.

In 1976, it was redefined to consist of:
 the Towns of Baie-D'Urfé, Dorion, Hudson, Île-Cadieux, Île-Perrot, Kirkland, Pincourt, Pointe-du-Moulin, Rigaud, Sainte-Anne-de-Bellevue, Sainte-Geneviève and Vaudreuil;
 the Counties of Soulanges and Vaudreuil;
 the village municipality of Senneville and the parish municipality of Saint-Raphaël-de-l'Île-Bizard;
 that part of the City of Pierrefonds lying southwest of the Town of Dollard-des-Ormeaux.

In 1987, it was redefined to consist of:
 the towns of Baie-D'Urfé, Dorion, Hudson, Île-Cadieux, Île-Perrot, Kirkland, Pincourt, Rigaud, Saint-Anne-de-Bellevue and Vaudreuil;
 in the County of the Île de Montréal: the Village Municipality of Senneville;
 the counties of Vaudreuil and Soulanges.

In 1996, it was redefined to consist of:
 the cities of Dorion, Hudson, L'Île-Cadieux, L'Île-Perrot, Pincourt, Rigaud and Vaudreuil;
 the County Regional Municipality of Vaudreuil-Soulanges.

Election results

1867–1914

1968–1997

See also 

 List of Canadian federal electoral districts
 Past Canadian electoral districts

External links 

Riding history from the Library of Parliament:
(1867 - 1914)
(1966 - 1997)

Former federal electoral districts of Quebec